Te Miro is an area in the Waipa District of the Waikato Region of the North Island of New Zealand. Te Miro has a population of approximately 500.

History
The name Te Miro for the area first became used in 1916, when it was surveyed and developed for European settlement. Prior to that, the area was known as Maungakawa. The first Maori Pā settlement in the Te Miro area was by the Ngati Haua people at Te Kawehitiki (37 49 20; 175 34 50), located on the lower reaches of the Maungakawa volcanic cone, which is on the present day Hopehill farm, at 789 Te Miro Road. There is a history of large Maori gatherings beginning at the site in the 1880s, with a notable large gathering in 1893. Maungakawa became a focal point for the Waikato King movement led by King Tawhiao. A Maori Parliament meeting house was established at the pā site in 1891, but was only used for large formal meetings a few times. The structure was badly damaged by fire in 1898. The damaged structure was still physically present but abandoned in 1902 before it was dismantled shortly after. Original access from Cambridge to the Maungakawa pā area before 1920 was by Maungakawa Road up what is now known as Sanatorium Hill.

The arrival of the first missionaries in New Zealand in 1814 eventually led to European settlers arriving in the Waikato. In the 1850s missionaries and farmers from Britain settled in the Te Miro area and introduced modern farming practices to local Maori, helping them set up two flour mills and importing grinding wheels from England and France. During this time, wheat was a profitable crop, but when merchants in Auckland began purchasing cheaper grain from Australia the market went into decline. In 1868, Daniel Thornton was the first settler to buy land near Te Miro, and around 1894, his widow established a large residence at what is now known as Sanatorium Hill.

In 1916, the government purchased most of the 12,000 acre farm of James Taylor, which was surveyed, named the Te Miro Settlement, and opened up to settlement after the First World War. 72 newly surveyed sections, ranging in size from 1 to 323 acres, were balloted to returning servicemen.  The new settlement initially used Maungakawa Road (south of the village and formerly called Taylor Road) to access Cambridge via Sanitorium Hill, but eventually Te Miro Road (west of the village, and formerly known as Valley Road) was linked at the bottom of the hill to Flume Road, and that route has now become the main access road. The focal village of Te Miro (37 48 35; 175 32 50) township was surveyed at the intersection of present day Te Miro and upper Maungakawa roads, with an initial 20 small lots and a designated school reserve site. A school was built on the designated school reserve in 1920, and a post office started operating out of a back room in a local residence in 1921. The first industry was a Rimu sawmill, located in the bush above the school, which was supported by a bush tramway. A community hall was built in 1956.  Much of the original balloted farmland required scrub clearing, and for the new settlers, there was little financial support from the government for the settlers. A plague of rabbits, and the depression of 1921 caused many of the initial soldier-settlers to abandon their allotments. However, some persisted, and established farms which have survived and prospered, and passed down through the generations.

In 2020, Te Miro celebrated its centennial, and a history of the school and district was published. It is presently a community of approximately 280 properties, made up of several dozen dairy and drystock farms over 50 acres in size, around 40 lifestyle blocks of between 2 and 50 acres, and the balance residences on less than 2 acres.

Geography
The area shown as Te Miro when retrieved from Google maps at present includes a southern lobe that is usually referred to locally as Whitehall. The remainder, excluding the Whitehall lobe and locally referred to as Te Miro, is about 27 square kilometres in size, approximately the same area as nearby Cambridge. The population of Te Miro is approximately 500 persons. The most visible point in the Te Miro district is the extinct volcanic cone known as Ruru (37 47 45; 175 34 50), which is 482 metres high. A 59-metre telecommunications tower is situated on the top of Ruru. From Ruru, two other extinct volcanic cones, Maungakawa (496 metres) (37 48 50; 175 36 40), and Te Tapui (495 metres) (37 50 30; 175 34 50) extend in a south easterly direction for approximately 10 kilometres. The contour of the district is gently rolling hills, from 40 to 496 metres above sea level. Land use is mainly pastoral and dairy farming, some areas of native bush and reserves, and some small blocks of Radiata pine forestry plantations. There is negligible industrial or commercial land use. Two translations of the Maori word miro are a twist, or a torrent of water, which may have originated from the many streams that twist through the hills of the area.

Geology
There are three main rock types in the Te Miro area, which are Greywacke (sediments deposited on the ocean floor about 140 million years ago); Andesite (lava flow from volcanic cones such as Mt Ruru, which erupted 6.2 million years ago); and Ignimbrite (consolidated volcanic ash from the Mangakino volcanic centre, from about 1 million years ago). The soil on top of the rock is largely yellow brown earth, a clay rich soil with coverings of volcanic ash. The bush regions are rich in fertile black loam.

Governance
Te Miro is administered by the Waipa District Council, which has its seat at Te Awamutu. Te Miro is part of the Taupō general parliamentary electorate and the Hauraki-Waikato Māori electorate.

Economy
Te Miro's main sources of local employment and income today come from dairy and drystock farming. Most other residents commute to jobs in Cambridge and Hamilton.

Transport
The main access to Te Miro is from Te Miro Road, which provides access through Cambridge to the Waikato Expressway, which is a 4 lane motorway to Auckland. State Highway 1 south of Cambridge connects to Tauranga, Rotorua and Taupo in the southeast. Hamilton Airport, 25 minutes drive from Te Miro, is the nearest airport and provides daily flights to all New Zealand's main centres. Auckland International Airport is about a 2-hour drive from Te Miro.

Sport
Te Miro is the home of the Te Miro Mountain Bike Park which provides 7 kilometres of mountain bike and jogging trails of various levels of difficulty.

Education

Te Miro School is a co-educational state primary school located in Te Miro Village.

The school was built in 1920. It currently has three classes: a junior class (years 0–2 named "Rata"), an intermediate class (years 3-4 named "Kowhai") and a senior class (years 5–8 named "Rimu").

Two secondary schools are located in Cambridge, serviced by school buses from Te Miro.

The University of Waikato and Wintec are major tertiary institutions in nearby Hamilton.

Notable residents
Past or present residents include:
Wiremu Tamihana, Ngati Haua chief
King Tawhiao, Waikato King Movement
Dick Tonks, Olympic medalist rower, Olympic rowing coach
Sarah Cowley, Track and field athlete, TV presenter

References

Waipa District
Populated places in Waikato